Sanie may refer to the following.
Sanie language
Sanie, Lower Silesian Voivodeship (south-west Poland)
Sanie, Łódź Voivodeship (central Poland)